Club Balonmano Torrevieja was a handball club based in Torrevieja, Valencian Community. CB Torrevieja played in the Liga ASOBAL until the 2011/2012 season, after which it disbanded due to financial problems.

History
Club Balonmano Torrevieja was founded in 1973 as Grupo de Empresas Torrevieja. The team played in regional divisions until 1888 that achieved promotion to Segunda Nacional. First appearance in Liga ASOBAL came in 2002–03 season playing at overall nine season in Liga ASOBAL until 2012 summer which the club was disbanded due to high debts and economic constraints.

Season by season

Notable players
 Diego Simonet
 Dimitrije Pejanović
 Nikola Prce
  Damir Opalić
 Eduardo Gurbindo
 Alberto Val
 Tonči Valčić
 Rodrigo Salinas Muñoz
 Birkir Guðmundsson
 Endre Nordli
 Eivind Nygaard
 Cornel Durău
 Jani Čop
 Uroš Mandić
 Mirko Stojanović
 Magnus Jernemyr
 Ivan Vukas
 Milan Rašić
 Rene Bach Madsen

Stadium information
Name: Palacio de los Deportes
City: Torrevieja
Capacity: 4,500
Address: Avda. Monge y Bielsa s/n

References

External links
CB Torrevieja Official Website
 Torrevieja city video. From a local resident.
 Documentacion para entrenadores de Balonmano
 Revista digital de la Liga Asobal

Spanish handball clubs
Sports teams in the Valencian Community
Handball clubs established in 1973
Handball clubs disestablished in 2012
1973 establishments in Spain
2012 disestablishments in Spain